Molybdenum(V) chloride is the inorganic compound with the empirical formula . This dark volatile solid is used in research to prepare other molybdenum compounds. It is moisture-sensitive and soluble in chlorinated solvents.

Structure
Usually called molybdenum pentachloride, it is in fact partly a dimer with the molecular formula . In the dimer, each molybdenum has local octahedral symmetry and two chlorides bridge between the molybdenum centers. A similar structure is also found for the pentachlorides of W, Nb and Ta. In the gas phase and partly in solution, the dimers partially dissociate to give a monomeric . The monomer is paramagnetic, with one unpaired electron per Mo center, reflecting the fact that the formal oxidation state is +5, leaving one valence electron on the metal center.

Preparation and properties
The unstable hexachloride  is not produced in this way.

 is reduced by acetonitrile to afford an orange acetonitrile complex, . This complex in turn reacts with THF to give , a precursor to other molybdenum-containing complexes.

The reaction proceeds via the unstable molybdenum(V) bromide, which releases bromine at room temperature.

 is a good Lewis acid toward non-oxidizable ligands. It forms an adduct with chloride to form . In organic synthesis, the compound finds occasional use in chlorinations, deoxygenation, and oxidative coupling reactions.

Reactions
 is reduced by acetonitrile:

Although it polymerizes tetrahydrofuran,  is stable in diethyl ether.

The hexachloride degrades to the pentachloride on standing.

Safety considerations
 is an aggressive oxidant and readily hydrolyzes to release HCl.

References

Chlorides
Molybdenum halides
Inorganic compounds